Borophagus dudleyi ("devouring glutton") is an extinct species of the genus Borophagus of the subfamily Borophaginae, a group of canids endemic to North America from the late Hemphillian of the Miocene epoch (10.3 Mya) through the Pliocene epoch (4.9 Mya).

Overview
Borophagus dudleyi was originally named Pliogulo dudleyi by T.E. White in 1941. Borophagus dudleyi, like other Borophaginae, are loosely known as "bone-crushing" or "hyena-like" dogs.  Though not the most massive borophagine by size or weight, it had a more highly evolved capacity to crunch bone than earlier, larger genera such as Epicyon, which seems to be an evolutionary trend of the group (Turner, 2004). During the Pliocene epoch, Borophagus began being displaced by Canis genera such as Canis edwardii and later by Canis dirus. Early species of Borophagus were placed in the genus Osteoborus until recently, but the genera are now considered synonyms. Borophagus parvus possibly led a hyena-like lifestyle scavenging carcasses of recently dead animals.

Taxonomy
Borophagus dudleyi was recombined as Cynogulo dudleyi by Kretzoi in 1968. It was recombined again as Osteoborus dudleyi by Webb in 1969 and Munthe in 1998. The animal was then synonymized subjectively with Borophagus crassapineatus by Richey in 1979. In 1987, Richard H. Tedford returned its original name and Xiaoming Wang along with Richard H. Tedford and Beryl E. Taylor concurred in a 1999 examination.

Morphology
Typical features of this genus are a bulging forehead and powerful jaws; it was probably a scavenger. Its crushing premolar teeth and strong jaw muscles would have been used to crack open bone, much like the hyena of the Old World. The adult animal is estimated to have been about 80 cm in length, similar to a coyote, although it was much more powerfully built.

Fossil distribution
Borophagus dudleyi fossil specimens are exclusive to a coastal area of North Carolina.

Sister genera
Carpocyon, Epicyon, Paratomarctus and Protepicyon.

See also
Borophaginae

References 

Alan Turner, "National Geographic:  Prehistoric Mammals" (Washington, D.C.:  Firecrest Books Ltd., 2004), pp. 112–114.  
Xiaoming Wang, "The Origin and Evolution of the Dog Family"  Accessed 1/30/06.

Further reading
Picture of an Osteoborus skull in a museum, from "World of the Wolf."  (Accessed 6/19/06)
Russell Hunt, "Ecological Polarities Of the North American Family Canidae: A New Approach to Understanding Forty Million Years of Canid Evolution" (Accessed 1/30/06).
Wang et al., "Phylogenetic Systematics of the Borophaginae (Carnivora:Canidae)."  Bulletin of the American Museum of Natural History, No. 243, Nov. 17 1999. (PDF) (Accessed 4/11/06)

Borophagines
Miocene canids
Pliocene carnivorans
Piacenzian extinctions
Prehistoric mammals of North America